Tudor Mușatescu (February 22, 1903 – November 4, 1970) was a Romanian playwright and short story writer, best known for his humorous prose.

Biography
Mușatescu was born in Câmpulung-Muscel to a family of middle-class intellectuals — his father was a lawyer while his mother was a writer. He studied at the Dinicu Golescu High School in his hometown, and  began writing during his early years in school. He completed studies at the University of Bucharest, where he earned a degree in Law and one in Literature. Afterwards, he wrote for several newspapers, including Rampa and Adevărul. 

Much of his work centers on provincial life in his native city, and includes political satires such as Titanic Vals (arguably, his most influential writing). The 1964 movie Titanic Waltz, directed by Paul Călinescu and starring Grigore Vasiliu-Birlic, was adapted from his play.

He died in Bucharest and was buried in the city's Bellu Cemetery, next to his wife, actress Kitty Stroescu (1907–1990) and their son, Bogdan Mușatescu (1941–2016), also an actor.

References

1903 births
1970 deaths
People from Câmpulung
University of Bucharest alumni
Romanian dramatists and playwrights
Romanian male short story writers
Romanian short story writers
20th-century Romanian dramatists and playwrights
20th-century short story writers
20th-century Romanian male writers
Burials at Bellu Cemetery